Olga Georgieva, known professionally as Sonya Monina (born December 29, 1988, in Brest, Belarus, Ukrainian SSR) is a Ukrainian fashion and custom designer. She is founder of SONYAMONINA, a menswear brand based in Kyiv. Her collections have been featured in Ukraine, Belarus, Russia and Slovakia. Her designs are regularly featured during Ukrainian Fashion Week.

Background 
Olga Georgieva was born on December 29, 1988, in Brest. At the age of 5, she moved to Simferopol with her family. In 2006, she started studying  "Design of leather goods" at Kyiv National University of Technologies and Design. In 2012, she created her own menswear clothing brand, SONYAMONINA. In 2013, Monina presented her debut collection within the Ukrainian Fashion Week. In 2015, she presented her collection of the spring/summer 2016 within Belarus Fashion Week. In 2016, She presented her collections at the "Festival of Young Fashion Designers" in Moscow. In 2018, she presented her collection of the summer 2019 at Mystetskyi Arsenal National Art and Culture Museum Complex within Ukrainian Fashion Week. She was nominated for "Best men’s clothing designer award" at the Best Fashion Awards 2019 in Ukraine. Monina is also a custom designer. Celebrity clients she has worked with have included Oskar Kuchera, Vitaliy Kozlovskiy, Kishe, Pierre Narcisse, Anton Zatsepin and Oleksandr Motornyi, among others.

References 

1995 births
Living people
Ukrainian women fashion designers
Ukrainian fashion designers
21st-century Ukrainian women artists